The Trinity Cathedral in Trubchevsk, Russia, was built in the 18th century on a hill rising above the river Desna. It incorporates the foundations of an earlier church, built in the beginning of the 16th century by the Princes Troubetzkoy, and it subsequently became the site of their family tomb. The present cathedral was built at the end of the 18th century over the old building. The belfry was added at the beginning of the 19th century.

Excavations in 1971 under the cathedral have revealed a rock temple of the 12th century.

External links 
Modern views
Photograph at Nature Picture Library

Churches in Bryansk Oblast
Russian Orthodox cathedrals in Russia
18th-century Eastern Orthodox church buildings
Cultural heritage monuments in Bryansk Oblast
Objects of cultural heritage of Russia of federal significance